USS Narragansett may refer to the following ships operated by the United States Navy:

 , a Union sloop, launched in 1859 and decommissioned in 1875.  During that time she saw significant action in the American Civil War.
 , a United States Navy ship
 , a passenger liner that served as a troopship in Europe during World War I.
 , built in 1905, purchased by the Navy in 1918 and struck in 1944.
 , commissioned in 1943 and decommissioned in 1946.
 , a fleet ocean tug launched in 1979 and struck in 2002.

United States Navy ship names